In politics, a figurehead is a person who de jure (in name or by law) appears to hold an important and often supremely powerful title or office, yet de facto (in reality) exercises little to no actual power. This usually means that they are head of state, but not head of government. The metaphor derives from the carved figurehead at the prow of a sailing ship.

Examples
Monarchs in some constitutional monarchies, and presidents in parliamentary republics are often considered to be figureheads. Commonly cited figureheads include Queen Elizabeth II, who was queen of 15 Commonwealth realms and head of the Commonwealth, but had no power over the nations in which she was not head of government and did not exercise power in her own realms on her own initiative. Other figureheads include the Emperor of Japan and the King of Sweden, as well as presidents in a majority of parliamentary republics, such as the presidents of India, Israel, Bangladesh, Greece, Hungary, Germany, Austria, Pakistan, and Singapore. Some heads of state in one-party communist states also have limited powers, such as President of China when not simultaneously holding the CCP General Secretary and CMC Chairman posts.

During the crisis of the March on Rome in 1922, King Victor Emmanuel III of Italy, though a figurehead, played a key role in handing power to Benito Mussolini. He also played a key role in the dismissal of Mussolini in 1943.

As a derogatory term
The word can also have more sinister overtones, and refer to a powerful leader, who should be exercising full authority, who is actually being controlled by a more powerful figure behind the throne.

See also

de jure
Executive (government)
Head of state
Post turtle
Personification
Uncle Sam
Puppet

References

 
 
Metaphors referring to ships
Positions of authority
Political metaphors referring to people